Gwangju City may refer to:
 Gwangju, the capital city of South Jeolla Province, South Korea
 Gwangju Uprising, 1980
 Gwangju City (Gyeonggi), a city in Gyeonggi Province, South Korea